Lionel John Monagas (June 26, 1889 – September 3, 1945) was an American actor originally from Caracas, Venezuela. A member of the original Lafayette Players company of Harlem, he appeared in theatrical and film productions.

Theatre credits

Monagas' stage credits are listed at the Internet Broadway Database.
 Confidence (1920)
 The Heartbreaker (1920)
 An African Prince (1920)
 Salome (1923)
 The Comedy of Errors (1923)
 Runnin' Wild (1924)
 Appearances (1925)
 My Magnolia (1926)
 Miss Calico (1926)
 Slim Slivers (1927)
 Ol' Man Satan (1932)
 Louisiana (1933)
 Hummin' Sam (1933)
 Blackbirds of 1933 (1933)
 Roll, Sweet Chariot (1934)
 The Man from Baltimore (1920)
 Walk Together Chillun (1936)
 Conjur' Man Dies (1936)
 The Show-Off (1937)
 One-Act Plays of the Sea (1937)
 Big White Fog (1940)
 The Eternal Magdalene (1943)
 Peepshow (1944)
 Anna Lucasta (1944)

Filmography

 The Millionaire (1927)
 Drums O' Voodoo (1934) as Ebenezer
 Lem Hawkins' Confession (1935)
 Murder in Harlem (1935)
 Keep Punching (1939)

Personal life

Monagas served in the United States Army in World War I, in the 92nd Division. He was buried on September 6, 1945, at Long Island National Cemetery.

References

External links
 

American male stage actors
20th-century Venezuelan male actors
1889 births
1945 deaths
Burials at Long Island National Cemetery
Venezuelan emigrants to the United States
20th-century American male actors
United States Army personnel of World War I
Venezuelan male stage actors
Male actors from Caracas
Venezuelan male film actors
American male film actors